Jacques Denier (1894-1983) was a French painter.

References

1894 births
1983 deaths
20th-century French painters
20th-century French male artists
19th-century French male artists